Viscount Ridley is a title in the Peerage of the United Kingdom. It was created in 1900 for the Conservative politician Sir Matthew White Ridley, 5th Baronet, Home Secretary from 1895 to 1900. He was made Baron Wensleydale, of Blagdon and Blyth in the County of Northumberland, at the same time, also in the Peerage of the United Kingdom. The latter title was a revival of the barony held by his maternal grandfather James Parke, Baron Wensleydale, whose title became extinct upon his death since none of his sons survived him.

Lord Ridley was succeeded by his son, the second Viscount. He represented Stalybridge in the House of Commons. His son, the third Viscount, was Chairman of Northumberland County Council. The latter's son, the fourth Viscount, succeeded in 1965. He notably served as Lord Steward of the Household from 1989 to 2001. , the titles are held by his son, the fifth Viscount, who succeeded in 2012. He is a writer.

The Ridley baronetcy, of Blagdon in the County of Northumberland, was created in the Baronetage of Great Britain in 1756 for Matthew White, with remainder to the heirs male of his sister Elizabeth, wife of Matthew Ridley. He was succeeded according to the special remainder by his nephew, the second Baronet. He represented Morpeth and Newcastle-upon-Tyne in Parliament. On his death the title passed to his eldest son, the third Baronet. He was also a Member of Parliament for Newcastle-upon-Tyne. He was succeeded by his son, the fourth Baronet. He represented Northumberland North in Parliament as a Conservative. Ridley was the husband of Cecilia Anne Parke, daughter of James Parke, 1st Baron Wensleydale. When he died the title was inherited by his son, the fifth Baronet, who was raised to the peerage as Viscount Ridley in 1900.

Three other members of the family have also gained distinction. Nicholas Ridley-Colborne, younger son of the second Baronet, was a politician and was created Baron Colborne in 1839. The Honourable Sir Jasper Nicholas Ridley, younger son of the first Viscount, was an authority on banking and the arts. Nicholas Ridley, Baron Ridley of Liddesdale, younger son of the third Viscount, was a Conservative politician.

The family seat is Blagdon Hall, near Cramlington, Northumberland.

Ridley (formerly White) baronets, of Blagdon (1756)

Sir Matthew White, 1st Baronet (c. 1727 – 1763)
Sir Matthew White Ridley, 2nd Baronet (1745–1813)
Sir Matthew White Ridley, 3rd Baronet (1778–1836)
Sir Matthew White Ridley, 4th Baronet (1807–1877)
Sir Matthew White Ridley, 5th Baronet (1842–1904) (created Viscount Ridley in 1900)

Viscount Ridley (1900)
Matthew White Ridley, 1st Viscount Ridley (1842–1904)
Matthew White Ridley, 2nd Viscount Ridley (1874–1916)
Matthew White Ridley, 3rd Viscount Ridley (1902–1964)
Matthew White Ridley, 4th Viscount Ridley (1925–2012)
Matthew White Ridley, 5th Viscount Ridley (born 1958)

The heir apparent is the present holder's son, the Hon. Matthew White Ridley (born 1993).

Male-line family tree

See also
Baron Colborne
Baron Ridley of Liddesdale
Viscount Ridley - Landholders of Blyth

References

Kidd, Charles, Williamson, David (editors). Debrett's Peerage and Baronetage (1990 edition). New York: St Martin's Press, 1990.

Viscountcies in the Peerage of the United Kingdom
Viscount
1756 establishments in Great Britain
1900 establishments in the United Kingdom
Noble titles created in 1900
Noble titles created for UK MPs